Kaleed Rasheed  (born June 15, 1982) is a Canadian politician who has served as the minister of public and business service delivery for Ontario since June 24, 2022. A member of the Progressive Conservative (PC) Party, he has represented Mississauga East—Cooksville in the Legislative Assembly of Ontario since 2018. He joined Premier Doug Ford's government as the associate minister of digital government in 2019.

Early life, education and career
Rasheed was born in Pakistan in 1982 and moved to Canada as a young adult.

Rasheed studied at the University of Guelph-Humber Business Program and graduated with a Bachelor of Business Administration (BBA) degree in 2009. Shortly after, he moved to the U.K. to earn his Master of Business Administration (MBA) at the University of Bradford before joining BlackBerry as an Enterprise Account Executive.

While at University of Guelph-Humber, Rasheed lead the creation of a cricket team that competed against other post-secondary schools.

Personal life 
His grandfather, Major Mohammad Aslam Khan, was a Second World War veteran serving in the British-Indian army and served as an army officer in Pakistan’s Baloch Regiment, an infantry regiment of the Pakistan army; and originally moved to Canada in 1967 along with his family. Rasheed lives in Mississauga with his wife Sofiya, and five children Noor, Mariam, Yousuf, Aisha, and Hamzah.

Political career

Rasheed was acclaimed the PC nomination for the riding of Mississauga East—Cooksville on May 24, 2017. He won the race for his riding in the 2018 election against incumbent, Dipika Damerla, making him the first PC member to win the riding provincially since 1999.

In 2019, he was named Deputy Government Whip following a cabinet shuffle.

Associate Minister of Digital Government 
June 18, 2021, in a major cabinet shuffle, Rasheed was promoted to be Ontario’s first ever associate minister of digital government, housed in the Ministry of Finance.

His portfolio priorities are outlined in the government’s Digital and Data Strategy, published in April 2021 by finance minister Peter Bethlenfalvy. Projects outlined in the strategy include the launch of the digital and data fellowship program, trusted artificial intelligence framework, data authority, and digital identification (ID).

Rasheed announced the launch of the digital and data fellowship program in December 2021, where private sector experts are matched with public service teams in order to work on technology related projects including digital access to courts, modernization of public services, and digital ID. The government developed the Verify Ontario, the province's COVID-19 proof-of-vaccination app.

Minister of Public and Business Service Delivery 
Rasheed was re-elected in the 2022 Ontario election and was named the minister of public and business service delivery in June 2022.

Electoral record

References

Progressive Conservative Party of Ontario MPPs
Politicians from Mississauga
Living people
Canadian Muslims
Canadian politicians of Pakistani descent
Pakistani emigrants to Canada
Naturalized citizens of Canada
Alumni of the University of Bradford
University of Guelph alumni
1982 births